Park Mi-hyun (born 26 January 1986) is a South Korean field hockey player. At the 2004, 2008 and 2012 Summer Olympics she competed with the Korea women's national field hockey team in the women's tournament. She competed at the 2006, 2010 and 2014 Asian Games.

She won a gold medal as a member of the South Korean team at 2014 Asian Games.

References

External links
 

1986 births
Living people
South Korean female field hockey players
Asian Games medalists in field hockey
Asian Games gold medalists for South Korea
Asian Games silver medalists for South Korea
Female field hockey midfielders
Field hockey players at the 2004 Summer Olympics
Field hockey players at the 2006 Asian Games
Field hockey players at the 2008 Summer Olympics
Field hockey players at the 2010 Asian Games
Field hockey players at the 2012 Summer Olympics
Field hockey players at the 2014 Asian Games
Field hockey players at the 2016 Summer Olympics
Field hockey players at the 2018 Asian Games
Medalists at the 2010 Asian Games
Medalists at the 2014 Asian Games
Olympic field hockey players of South Korea
Field hockey players from Seoul
20th-century South Korean women
21st-century South Korean women